Kevin Dean Wickander (born January 4, 1965) is a former Major League Baseball player.

Wickander attended Cortez High School in Phoenix, Arizona and played college baseball at Grand Canyon University. Although he grew up only ten miles from the campus of Grand Canyon, he admitted he had not heard of it until three months before he enrolled. He was the ace of the Grand Canyon Antelopes baseball team that won the 1986 NAIA World Series.

Wickander made his Major League debut with the Cleveland Indians on August 10, 1989. He missed most of the 1990 season after breaking his elbow. In May 1991, he sought treatment for alcoholism and took a leave of absence to be treated in-patient at the Cleveland Clinic. After being successfully discharged from treatment, he pitched his first full Major League season in 1992. In May of the following year, he was traded to the Cincinnati Reds.

Wickander started the 1994 season pitching in Taiwan but, after appearing in seven games, traveled back to the United States for the birth of his first child and did not return to Taiwan.

After his playing career ended he spent several years in prison on drug and other related charges.

References

External links

1965 births
Living people
Baseball players from Iowa
Major League Baseball pitchers
Canton-Akron Indians players
Cleveland Indians players
Kinston Indians players
Cincinnati Reds players
Milwaukee Brewers players
Detroit Tigers players
Grand Canyon Antelopes baseball players
Sportspeople from Fort Dodge, Iowa
Batavia Trojans players
Colorado Springs Sky Sox players
Indianapolis Indians players
New Orleans Zephyrs players
Toledo Mud Hens players
Uni-President Lions players
Williamsport Bills players
American expatriate baseball players in Taiwan
American sportspeople convicted of crimes
American people convicted of theft
Anchorage Bucs players